Robert "Bob" Edward Manuel Sr. (born February 21, 1935 in Stourbridge, England died April 14, 2017 in Elliot Lake, Ontario, Canada) was a Korean War veteran best known for getting Vimy Ridge Day recognized as a National Heritage Day in Canada.

Early life
Robert was born in the small town of Stourbridge, England. He - along with his parents, Lillian Rae Manuel (née Liscumb) and Percy Manuel, and older brothers Donald and Reginald - immigrated to Canada where he was raised and educated in Kirkland Lake, Ontario, Canada. Robert was involved in the Royal Canadian Army Cadets and by the age of 13, was Rank Captain.
After years of military training, Manuel signed up to be a Peacekeeper in the Korean War.

Post-War Life
Robert returned to Canada after his service in Korea and resided in Elliot Lake, Ontario. He lived there with his wife Colleen Manuel (née Foster) from 1956 and until his death in 2017. He and Colleen wed on July 28, 1956, and the two had four children together - Robert, Christine, Stephen, and Terry. Bob was an underground electrician for many years and retired to work on personal projects and give back to his community.

Contributions and Community Service
Robert Manuel was an active community member and fervent patriot throughout his life. He was the founding member of the Elliot Lake Legion Branch 561 marching band , where he was a Drum Major. He was the Director of the Elliot Lake Chamber of Commerce and Regional Director of the Terry Fox Foundation for 10 years. Robert helped establish many associations such as the Korean Veterans Association, the Navy League of Elliot Lake, and the Legion marching band. In the community of Elliot Lake, Robert introduced the Elliot Lake Winter Fest and the annual Legion New Years Levée, and, with the support of his wife Colleen to a great extent, a number of other events in Elliot Lake.

Robert Manuel was the chairman at the Woodland Cemetery Memorial Pilgrimage Annual July 1 Observance. He was also an executive member in the Royal Canadian Legion Branch 561, having attained the highest award the Legion issues. He raised funds for the Kidney Foundation in Elliot Lake and has started a fundraiser of his own, Koins for Kids, under the Christian Children's Fund of Canada.

Achievements
Robert accomplished a number of personal feats in addition to his community work. Most notably, he garnered support from Canadians of all statures in having the Battle of Vimy Ridge recognized as a national heritage day in Canada. From 2004 forward, April 9 has served as a reminder of the great sacrifices and contribution Canada and its military made to the world.

Manuel also initiated the recognition of the Canadian Peace Keepers' Day in Ontario, which is also a federally recognized day that falls on August 9.

Awards and honours
Jaycee of the Year - 1964
Past Presidents Metal - Royal Canadian Legion (seven terms)
Life Member - Royal Canadian Legion
Certificate of Merit - Canada Council
Certificate of Merit - Terry Fox Youth Centre
15 Year Volunteer Service Award - Ministry of Citizenship - Ontario
Korean Veterans Association - Merit Medal
Legion Dominion Command - highest award - The Palm Leaf
Friendship Awards - First Elliot Lake Scouts
Governor General Award for Volunteers - 1992
Canadian Peace Keeping Medal
Elliot Lake Civic Award - 2001
Coronation Medal - 1952
Queen Elizabeth Golden Jubilee Medal
Ambassadors Peace Medal - Korean Government
Ontario Bi-Centennial Medal - Province of Ontario
Canada 125 Medal

External links
 Veteran Affairs
 Robert Manuel
 Korean Veterans Association
 Vimy Ridge bill Passed
 Peacekeepers Day Bill Passes committee stage
 "Peace, no more war," says Veteran honoured in Elliot Lake

1935 births
Canadian military personnel of the Korean War
People from Stourbridge
People from Kirkland Lake
Living people
Canadian Army officers
English emigrants to Canada